Braithwaite Hall is a 17th-century manor house in Coverdale in the Yorkshire Dales in England. It is a Grade II* listed building, owned by the National Trust.

References

External links 

National Trust website

Coverdale (dale)
Country houses in North Yorkshire
Manor houses in England
Grade II* listed buildings in North Yorkshire
National Trust properties in North Yorkshire